Simona Milinytė (born December 12, 1995), also known as Simonna, is a Lithuanian actress and singer. From 2007 to 2011, she participated in numerous music competitions in European countries including Lithuania, Italy, and Turkey. Most notably, Simonna joined the national Eurovision Song Contest in Lithuania as the youngest contestant ever at the time, placed third in the semi-final and seventh in the National Final.
In 2008, she released her first album titled 12.
In December 2013, she released her second album, which was self-titled Simonna and consisted of 15 songs recorded in both Lithuanian and English.
After 2014, Simonna had her music videos played by MTV and received a Vevo-certified channel.

Simonna is a guest star in "NCIS: Los Angeles" season finale episode.
In 2019, Simonna started to host her own radio show "Bleav In Sports Gossip" about sports and entertainment industry. Simonna's new podcast airs every week and is available on iHeartRadio, iTunes, Google Play, Spotify, etc.
People, Entertainment Weekly, Yahoo Celebrities, LA Times, BBC wrote about Simonna.

Since 2018, Simonna has shifted focus on her acting career. She played a lead role in the 2018 TV movie First Month is for Free. Simonna played an "r girl" in the drama Hollywood Rooftop, which was directed by Brett Leonard. Simonna has also acted in numerous short films. Simonna is a lead in a new short movie "Robot Romance" with Golden Globe winner, Oscar nominee for the Best actress Sally Kirkland. This movie is several festivals. It's the WINNER:
DRUK International Film Festival - Short film CRITICS CHOICE AWARD.
World Film Carnival - SINGAPORE "Best Short Film";
Virgin Spring Cinefest - Silver Award "Best Short Film";
She was a supporting actress in Crazy For the Boys and horror-thriller The Great Illusion. In the horror-thriller The Blackstone, Simonna played the role of a ghostly woman. Simonna is playing a lead role in several movies, tv series, she is series regular in animation series.

Career

2007–2011: Career beginnings and 12

In 2008, Simonna participated in a contest in Pompeii, Italy.
Later that year, Simonna participated in the Talent Kaunas 2008 contest, which took place in Riga, Latvia.
She won second place performing "Baltic Talents".

In 2009, Simonna participated in the First Republic Children and Youth Vocal competition, performing "Nightingale's Valley" and winning second place. She participated in the St. Petersburg contest '"the path to the stars – in 2009". Simonna won first place in the international talent competition "Kaunas – 2009".
She won third place in "Baltic Transit".From 2008 to 2009, Simonna toured Lithuania with several singers from Lithuania in the Olialia Zuzi Fiesta Tour.

In 2010, at the TV festival "TV Start", which took place in Turkey, Simonna won the Grand Prix in the vocal category and won first place in the model category.
In the "San Remo" festival in Italy, Simonna became a finalist. Later that year, Simonna successfully completed the New York Film Academy's "Four Week Musical Film Workshop".

In 2011, Simonna was invited to attend TwitChange, a celebrity Twitter auction that included Kim Kardashian, Eva Longoria, and others.
Simonna acted in the Lithuanian TV series Giminės. Po 20 metų as a guest star.

2012–13: Eurovision Song Contest and Simonna 
In 2012 Simonna applied to the national Eurovision Song Contest in Lithuania with her song "One of a Kind". She finished third in the semi-final and seventh in the national final, without reaching the super-final. She was the youngest national Lithuania's Eurovision Song Contest participant ever.

Simonna released "One of a Kind" as a single. It was written by F. Westin and produced by Bobby Ljunggren and Marcos Ubeda. The song was used for Simonna's Eurovision project and her second album, self-titled Simonna. The song was initially created for the Eurovision Song Contest winner Carola Häggkvist, but when she refused to participate in Eurovision Song Contest again, the producers gave the song to Simonna. In early 2012, the music video for "One of a Kind" was shot in Lithuania.

In March 2012, Simonna signed with US-based management company June Entertainment and manager John Ryan Jr.

In May 2013, Simonna revealed on Twitter new lyrics from her upcoming song. As of June 2013, Simonna was working on a new song with American rapper and songwriter King Kaseem, who was to be featured on the song as well. On July 25, 2013, Simonna revealed that her song was called "The Mountain". On February 11, 2014, Simonna released her new single "My Eyes On You". On February 20, 2014, Simonna terminated her contract with June Entertainment. On February 24, 2014, MTV started to play Simonna's music videos. In December 2013, Simonna released her album Simonna, which consisted of 15 songs recorded in both Lithuanian and English.

2014–2017
In September 2014, Simonna started studying in New York Film Academy in Los Angeles, California.

In 2015, Simonna decided to focus on her education and take a break from music. In March 2016, Simonna graduated from The Center of Legal Studies and became a certified victim advocate at California State University, Monterey Bay. To celebrate graduation, Simonna released her new hit single "MOONLIGHT" on the Vevo channel. Simonna received an official Vevo-certified channel.

In 2016, Simonna studied communications at Southern New Hampshire University.

Simonna became an official member of the Recording Academy – The Grammy's. Simonna has been in the 56th, 57th, and 58th Grammy's consideration lists. Simonna's new singles "Say to Me", "Rush for Love", and "My Eyes on You" were released on her Vevo channel. Simonna released a trailer for a new music video featuring Harry Potter actor Devon Murray. The full music video was set to release in late 2017.

2018–19
Simonna received roles in various films. She played a lead role in the 2018 TV movie First Month is for Free. Simonna played an "girl" in the drama Hollywood Rooftop, which was directed by Brett Leonard. Simonna has also acted in short films "inSANE", "Short Movie", "Trail of Glitter", and "The Third Rainbow".
She was a supporting actress in Crazy For the Boys and horror-thriller The Great Illusion. In the horror-thriller The Blackstone, Simonna played the role of a ghostly woman.

Simonna is a guest star in "NCIS: Los Angeles" season finale episode.
In 2019, Simonna started to host her own radio show "Bleav In Sports Gossip" about sports and entertainment industry. Simonna's new podcast airs every week and is available on iHeartRadio, iTunes, Google Play, Spotify, etc.
People, Entertainment Weekly, Yahoo Celebrities, LA Times, BBC wrote about Simonna.
Simonna is a lead in a new short movie "Robot Romance" with Golden Globe winner, Oscar nominee for the Best actress Sally Kirkland. This movie is several festivals. It's the WINNER:
DRUK International Film Festival - Short film CRITICS CHOICE AWARD.
World Film Carnival - SINGAPORE "Best Short Film";
Virgin Spring Cinefest - Silver Award "Best Short Film";

In 2019, Simonna has been booked for several movies and TV series. She graduated from Southern New Hampshire University and has a Bachelor of Arts in Communications degree.

Discography

Albums

Singles

Filmography

References

External links
 
 

1995 births
Living people
21st-century American women singers
21st-century American singers
American actresses
American women pop singers
California State University, Monterey Bay alumni
Child pop musicians
English-language singers from Lithuania
21st-century Lithuanian women singers
Lithuanian actresses
Lithuanian pop singers
Russian-language singers
Southern New Hampshire University alumni